Leonel Arístides Guevara (born October 7, 1983 in San Alejo) is a former Salvadoran professional footballer.

Club career
Guevara started his career with Salvadoran Second Division side Universidad Gerardo Barrios in 2002, before joining UDET in 2003 and Atlético Chaparrastique in the two years thereafter.

He made his debut at the highest level with Vista Hermosa before he moved to Águila in 2008.

He played for new team Ciclón del Golfo, for a whole season, before joining Dragón for the 2014 season.

International career
Guevara made his debut for El Salvador in a November 2006 friendly match against Bolivia and has earned, as of December 2010, a total of 5 caps, scoring no goals.

He has represented his country at the 2007 CONCACAF Gold Cup.

His final international game was a June 2007 CONCACAF Gold Cup match against the United States.

References

External links

1983 births
Living people
People from La Unión Department
Association football defenders
Salvadoran footballers
El Salvador international footballers
2007 UNCAF Nations Cup players
2007 CONCACAF Gold Cup players
C.D. Vista Hermosa footballers
C.D. Águila footballers